, in English title The Life of the Witch Who Remains Single for About 300 Years, is a Japanese manga series written by Shigemitsu Harada and illustrated by Kyūjo Matsumoto. It was serialized in Hakusensha's seinen manga magazines Young Animal Arashi (2018) and Young Animal (2018–2020), with its chapters collected in seven tankōbon volumes.

Publication
Written by Shigemitsu Harada and illustrated by Kyūjo Matsumoto, Majo wa Mioji Kara was serialized in Hakusensha's seinen manga magazine Young Animal Arashi from January 4 to June 1, 2018, when the magazine ceased its publication. The series was later transferred to Young Animal, where it ran from July 13, 2018, to May 22, 2020. Hakusensha collected its chapters in seven tankōbon volumes, released from October 29, 2018, to September 29, 2020.

Volume list

See also
Cells at Work! Code Black—another manga series by the same writer
Ippatsu Kiki Musume—another manga series by the same writer
Megami no Sprinter—another manga series by the same writer
Motoyome—another manga series by the same authors
Yuria 100 Shiki—another manga series by the same writer

References

Further reading

External links
 

Comedy anime and manga
Hakusensha manga
Seinen manga
Slice of life anime and manga
Witchcraft in anime and manga